Marido en alquiler is an American telenovela premiered on Telemundo on July 10, 2013, and concluded on January 13, 2014. The telenovela is created by the Venezuelan author Perla Farías, based on the Brazilian drama written by Aguinaldo Silva, entitled Fina Estampa. Produced by Telemundo Studios and Rede Globo de Televisão, and distributed by Telemundo Internacional.

It stars Sonya Smith as Griselda Carrasco — A woman who is dedicated to the business of repairing cars and appliances, and striving to ensure that her children have a better future, along with Juan Soler as Reinaldo Ibarra, Maritza Rodríguez as Teresa Cristina, Roberto Manrique as Kike, Gabriel Coronel as José Antonio, Kimberly Dos Ramos as Patricia Ibarra, Ricardo Chávez as Gabriel Rodríguez, and Miguel Varoni as José Salinas.

Plot 
Griselda Carrasco (Sonya Smith) is a middle-aged handywoman in a working class community. She takes care of her three kids and grandson after José Antonio (Miguel Varoni), her husband, disappeared at sea 15 years ago.

Needing to support her family, Griselda takes on a job doing what she knows best: Fixing the crumbling neighborhood with her trusty toolbox while traveling in her van. She becomes the friendly neighborhood "Husband for Hire."

One day while driving around Miami in her van, she happens to meet Reinaldo (Juan Soler), a charming man whose car has just gotten a flat tire.  Seeing Reinaldo struggling with the situation, she jumps out of her van and quickly runs over to him and fixes his flat, offering him her business card. Griselda subsequently meets Teresa Cristina (Maritza Rodríguez), a lady of elegant manners, smug, capable of committing the worst follies and married to Reinaldo, famous chef of the restaurant Gourmet Palmer. A kind-hearted man who lacks mechanical skills, Reinaldo will be intrigued, if not spellbound, before Griselda, the woman who can fix anything very quickly.

Griselda is unaware that Antonio (Gabriel Coronel), her son, is the boyfriend of Patricia (Kimberly Dos Ramos), the daughter of Reinaldo and Teresa Cristina, who will eventually become their worst enemy. To her great surprise – and disappointment – she discovers that Antonio presented to his future in-laws a certain Giselle (Elluz Peraza), an actress hired to pretend to be Antonio's mother (Antonio is pretending to come from an upper-class family and doesn't want his girlfriend to know the real story).

Griselda's fortune changes overnight when she wins the jackpot of the lottery: $43 million. From then on her life will not be the same, although she stands firm in her beliefs and values. With a new look, "La Carrasco" creates the "Maridos de Alquiler" network, although her fortune also attracts a few interested parties, starting with José Antonio (Miguel Varoni), who rises from the dead when he learns that his wife is now a multimillionaire.

To the misfortune of Teresa Cristina, Griselda moves to a mansion in the same luxurious area, and Teresa Cristina must now tolerate the person she most despises as her neighbor. Teresa Cristina declares war on Griselda, without imagining that Reinaldo, tired of her lies, will abandon her to pursue Griselda, with whom he has fallen deeply in love. With Griselda, the handsome chef will be reunited with the values of friendship, love and family.

Production 
Aguinaldo Silva, author of the Brazilian original Fina Estampa, will be supervising adaptation and screenplay for Telemundo together with Perla Farías. As of July 21, 2012, the adaptation is ongoing. Mr. Silva is best known for incredible rating successes such as Roque Santeiro in the 80s, and Vale Tudo adapted in the 2000s by Telemundo as Vale todo.

The working title in TV Globo for Fina Estampa in Brazil was Marido de Aluguel, however, it was later changed. For Telemundo's version, it used the Marido de Aluguel name, though it translated it in Spanish.

Opening credits and theme 
Latin Grammy award winner Ana Bárbara performs the soap opera's theme song Yo Soy La Mujer. The singer also participated in the soap opera.  Yo Soy La Mujer is also the title to Ana Barbara's eleventh studio album.  The track Yo Soy La Mujer was re-recorded in Banda and became part of Ana Bárbara's music repertoire. The song was inspired by the hard work, struggle, and immense effort put forth by Griselda Carrasco as a single parent to support her three children and grandson.

Also part of the opening theme is the song by Carlos Gatica, called Como te explico, a love song inspired by Reinaldo and Griselda.

Cast and characters 

Griselda Carrasco (Sonya Smith) -  
Reinaldo Ibarra Carrasco (Juan Soler) - 
Teresa Cristina Palmer (Maritza Rodríguez) - 
José Salinas Carrasco (Miguel Varoni) - 
José Enrique "Kike" Salinas Carrasco (Roberto Manrique) -  
José Antonio Salinas Carrasco (Gabriel Coronel) -  
 Patricia Ibarra Palmer Carrasco (Kimberly Dos Ramos) - 
Gabriel Rodríguez Carrasco (Ricardo Chávez) - 
Silva (David Saltoff)- The hotel manager where Barbara works as a maid.

Awards and nominations

References

External links 
 
 Telemundo Now, Telemundo Full Episodes

2013 American television series debuts
American television series based on telenovelas
Telemundo telenovelas
2013 telenovelas
Spanish-language American telenovelas
2014 American television series endings
American television series based on Brazilian television series